William Richard Le Fanu (24 February 1816 – 8 September 1894) was an Irish railway engineer and Commissioner of Public Works. Le Fanu was born at the Royal Hibernian Military School in Dublin into a literary family of Huguenot, Irish and English descent.

Biography 
Born in Dublin, Le Fanu attended Trinity College Dublin. He was apprenticed to and became assistant to Sir John Benjamin Macneill. His most notable projects were railway schemes in Ireland. In 1846 he was appointed resident engineer in the completion of the Cork railway terminal. He then succeeded MacNeill as consulting engineer to the railway and supervised various line extensions including those to Roscrea, Parsonstown and Nenagh. Le Fanu was appointed to the Board of Public Works in 1863, first as deputy Chairman later as Chairman.

Projects
 Cork railway terminal
 Knocknadundarragh viaduct, Borris, County Carlow
 Cahir railway viaduct

References

Irish civil engineers
1894 deaths
1816 births
William Richard